Guy Lionel Greville Harry (19 December 1894 – 9 January 1979) was a British fencer. He competed at the 1928 and 1936 Summer Olympics. In 1928, he won the sabre title at the British Fencing Championships.

References

1894 births
1979 deaths
British male fencers
Olympic fencers of Great Britain
Fencers at the 1928 Summer Olympics
Fencers at the 1936 Summer Olympics
People from Edmonton, London
Sportspeople from London